Commander, Submarine Force, U.S. Pacific Fleet (COMSUBPAC) is the principal advisor to the Commander, United States Pacific Fleet (COMPACFLT) for submarine matters.  The Pacific Submarine Force (SUBPAC) includes attack, ballistic missile and auxiliary submarines, submarine tenders, floating submarine docks, deep submergence vehicles and submarine rescue vehicles throughout the Pacific.

The Force provides anti-submarine warfare, anti-surface ship warfare, precision land strike, mine warfare, intelligence, surveillance and early warning and special warfare capabilities to the U.S. Indo-Pacific Command and strategic deterrence capabilities to the U.S. Strategic Command.

COMSUBPAC's mission is to provide the training, logistical plans, manpower and operational plans and support and tactical development necessary to maintain the ability of the Force to respond to both peacetime and wartime demands.

Submarines and Units
These are the submarines and related units reporting to COMSUBPAC.

Pearl Harbor, Hawaii

Commander, Submarine Squadron 1 (COMSUBRON One)

 
 
USS Missouri (SSN-780)
 
USS Illinois (SSN-786)

Commander, Submarine Squadron 7 (COMSUBRON Seven)

Bremerton, Washington
 Priority Material Office

Bangor, Washington

Commander, Submarine Group 9 (COMSUBGRU Nine)

Commander, Submarine Squadron 17 (COMSUBRON Seventeen)

Commander, Submarine Squadron 19 (COMSUBRON Nineteen)
USS Bremerton (SSN-698)
USS Jacksonville (SSN-699)

 
USS Louisiana (SSBN-743)

Commander, Submarine Development Squadron 5 (COMSUBDEVRON Five)

San Diego, California

 Arctic Submarine Laboratory

Commander, Submarine Squadron 11 (COMSUBRON Eleven)
USS Scranton (SSN 756)
USS Alexandria (SSN 757)
USS Hampton (SSN 767)
USS Santa Fe (SSN 763)
 
 Undersea Rescue Command

Western Pacific

Commander, Submarine Group 7 (COMSUBGRU Seven) (Yokosuka, Japan)
 Responsible for submarines deployed to the Western Pacific, the Persian Gulf, Red Sea, Gulf of Oman, Arabian Sea and parts of the Indian Ocean.

Commander, Submarine Squadron 15 (COMSUBRON Fifteen) (Guam)

 
USS Asheville (SSN-758)
USS Jefferson City (SSN 759)
USS Annapolis (SSN 760)
USS Springfield (SSN 761)

Commander, Submarine Squadron 21 (COMSUBRON TWENTY ONE) (Bahrain)

Virginia Beach, Virginia
 Commander, Undersea Surveillance
 Naval Ocean Processing Facility Whidbey Island, Washington 
 Integrated Undersea Surveillance System Operational Support Center Little Creek, Virginia

Officers Serving as COMSUBPAC
The following is an incomplete list:
Rear Admiral Wilhelm L. Friedell, 1939–1941
Rear Admiral Thomas Withers, Jr., 1941–May 1942
Rear Admiral Robert H. English, May 1942–20 January 1943 (killed in an aircraft accident)
Captain John H. "Babe" Brown (pro tem), 20 Jan 1943–1943
Vice Admiral Charles A. Lockwood, 1943–1946
Rear Admiral Allan Rockwell McCann, 1946–1948
Rear Admiral Oswald S. Colclough, 1948–1949
Rear Admiral John H. "Babe" Brown, 1949–1951
Rear Admiral Charles B. "Swede" Momsen, 1951–1953
Rear Admiral George L. Russell, 1953–1955
Rear Admiral Leon J. Huffman, 1955–1956
Rear Admiral Elton W. "Joe" Grenfell, 1956–1959†
Rear Admiral William E. "Pete" Ferrall, 1959–1960†
Rear Admiral Roy S. "Ensign" Benson, 1960–1962†
Rear Admiral Bernard A. "Chick" Clarey, 1962–1964†
Rear Admiral Eugene B. "Lucky" Fluckey, 1964–1966†
Rear Admiral John H. Maurer, 1966–1968†
Rear Admiral Walter L. Small, 1968–1970†
Rear Admiral Paul L. Lacy, Jr., 1970–1972 (Last WW2 submarine skipper in the job)
Rear Admiral Frank D. McMullen, 1972-1975
Rear Admiral Charles H. Griffiths, 1975-1977
Rear Admiral William J. Cowhill, 1977-1979
Rear Admiral Nils R. Thunman, 1979-1981
Rear Admiral Bernard M. Kauderer, 1981-1983
Rear Admiral Austin B. Scott, Jr., 1983-1985
Rear Admiral James N. Darby, 1985-1987
Rear Admiral Ralph W. West, Jr., 1987-1987
Rear Admiral James G. Reynolds, 1987-1989
Rear Admiral Michael C. Colley, 1989-1991
Rear Admiral Henry C. McKinney, 1991-1993
Rear Admiral Jon M. Barr, 1993-1996
Rear Admiral Winford G. Ellis, 1996-1998
Rear Admiral Albert H. Konetzni, Jr., 1998-2001
Rear Admiral John B. Padgett, III, 2001-2003
Rear Admiral Paul F. Sullivan, 2003-2005
Rear Admiral Jeffrey B. Cassias, 2005-2006
Rear Admiral Joseph A. Walsh, 2006-2008 
Rear Admiral Douglas J. McAneny, 2008–2010
Rear Admiral James F. Caldwell, Jr., 2010–2013
Rear Admiral Phillip G. Sawyer, 2013–2015
Rear Admiral Frederick J. Roegge, 2015–2017
Rear Admiral Daryl Caudle, 2017–2019
Rear Admiral Blake L. Converse, 2019–April 2021
Rear Admiral Jeffrey T. Jablon, April 2021 – Present 

† Wartime submarine skipper

See also
COMSUBLANT
COMNAVSUBFOR

References
  (Google books online preview)

External links
 Commander Submarine Force, U.S. Pacific Fleet

Commander, Submarine Pac
Commander, Submarine Pac